Petrilovo is a rural locality (a village) in Pogorelovskoye Rural Settlement, Totemsky District, Vologda Oblast, Russia. The population was 78 as of 2002.

Geography 
Petrilovo is located 58 km southwest of Totma (the district's administrative centre) by road. Zhilino is the nearest rural locality.

References 

Rural localities in Tarnogsky District